Jakub Hořčický (in Latin Jacobus Sinapius) (1575 – 25 September 1622), later granted the title z Tepence ("of Tepenec"), was a Bohemian pharmacist and personal doctor of Emperor Rudolf II.  The latinized name is a translation of his family name, which means "mustard" in Czech ("sinapius" in Latin).

Biography
According to his college records, Jakub was born in Bořenovice in Moravia in a lower-class family. He initially worked as kitchen helper at the Jesuit school at Krumlov, but was eventually admitted to the Krumlov Seminary of poor students in 1590. Jakub eventually graduated from the Krumlov Gymnasium, where he studied poetry and rhetoric, and became a pharmacist himself. There he also worked in the college's pharmacy, on topics involving chemistry and herbalism, under the overseeing of Martin Schaffner (1564–1608).

By 1598, he started studying Aristotelian philosophy at the Clementinum college in Prague (which was later merged with Charles University), and at the same time oversaw the kitchen and pantry, but continued working in chemistry and pharmacy. However, Sinapius was not satisfied with the teachings there, learning Barbara and Celare, instead of physics and the origins of nature. Because his herbal skills to treat illness impressed, he was allowed gardening near the river Vltava, under the Bräke. Here he grew herbs and set up a laboratory at Smíchov (then a village behind Prague walls), the Clementinum's botanical garden. There, or at the garden, he distilled a very popular Aqua Sinapis ("Die Sinapischen Wasser", Horczicze in Latin means mustard, hence mustard water) whose sale made him a wealthy man.

In 1600, he became the administrator of the Jesuit college in Jindřichův Hradec, and in 1606 he became capitaneus and administrator of the properties of the St. George's Convent in the Prague Castle. In 1607 he was named imperial chemist by Rudolf II. In return for curing the emperor of a grave disease, he was ennobled with the title "de Tepenec", presumably after the medieval Tepenec Castle (destroyed in 1391) near Olomouc. He lent emperor Rudolf II money and received from him in return an estate around town Mělník. He also supported students of the studies of catholic theology financially.

In the religious disputes of the early 17th century, Jakub strongly defended the Catholic side. He became the administrator of the  but was jailed in 1620, when the Protestants took charge of the town. Subsequently, was exchanged by another prisoner (famous physician Jessenius) and exiled, but later, after defeating of the Bohemian Revolt, he returned to Mělník and lived there the rest of his life.

He died in 1622, from a horse-fall that he had suffered a year before. Two days before his death he was moved to the Clementinum at the care of the Jesuits, and left them the sum of 50,000 gold coins and his Mělník estate. He is buried in the Church of St. Salvator in the Clementinum.

Writings
In 1609 he published a pro-Catholic pamphlet which saw several reprintings.  According to a 1777 source, he had written several manuscripts on chemistry and botany.

Connection to the Voynich manuscript
Book dealer Wilfrid Voynich saw Jakub's name and title at the bottom of the first page of the Voynich manuscript. Voynich saw the faint writing later revealed as Jacobus Sinapius (Jacobus Hořčický de Tepenec), Voynich subsequently used many chemicals to make it clearer but failed. It was later revealed by ultraviolet light and has been compared with other samples of his signature. Jakub is thus the second person known to have owned the Voynich manuscript after Emperor Rudolf II. Its attested provenance begins with him, since the story that it was owned by Emperor Rudolf II rests on a single piece of unsubstantiated hearsay, related at second hand in a letter to Athanasius Kircher.

References

1575 births
1622 deaths
17th-century Bohemian physicians
Czech pharmacists